Volume 2 is a vinyl anthology LP audio record of hit Chuck Berry recordings, made and printed in France on the "impact" Records label.  In the 1970s, it was available for purchase in U.S. music stores, with a small adhesive sticker on the reverse of the album jacket stating, "Imported/Distributed" by Peters International, New York, N.Y.

The recordings of the major hits "Johnny B. Goode" and "Rock and Roll Music" are monaural and the obverse face of the jacket bears the message "MONO STEREO" along the top edge, along with the catalog number 6886 407. A color photograph by Claude Delorme of Berry (judging by his appearance perhaps circa 1970 Berry), performing on guitar in a green and turquoise floral pattern jacket, takes up about half the area of the cover, which otherwise is in shades of red and pink.  The Chuck Berry name in large block capital letters in black ink dominates the title area of the cover, with "Volume 2" in a significantly smaller font centered on the line beneath it.

The album jacket bears the names of ten of the twelve songs included on the LP printed above the Berry photograph, followed by "Etc."

Messages printed on the cover assure the owner of original recordings, presented with the permission of Mercury Records, "Enregistrements Originaux" on the obverse and "Avec l'Aimable Autorisation Des Disques Mercury" on the reverse.  The album jacket design employs the English language for song titles, in accordance with the original Mercury releases (except that the "School" in "School Days" is misspelled "Scholl"), and for such phrases as "Produced by Roy Dea and Boo Frazer"; but most of the printed material appears in French, such as a message about a ring of graphics that appears on the record labels of side 1 and side 2 that serve as a visual aid to whether the phonograph platter is actually rotating at 33.33 RPM.

The product gives the listener recordings that indeed are familiar to former listeners of 1970s U.S. AM radio "oldies" shows as hit songs from the 1950s/1960s charts.

Track listing

Side 1 (Face 1)
 Johnny B. Goode
 Misery
 Scholl Days "Ring Goes the Bell" (sic)
 I Love Her, I Love Her
 Check Me Out
 Feelin' It

Side 2 (Face 2)
 Ma Dear, Ma Dear
 Fillmore Blues
 The Love I Lost
 My Tambourine
 Rock Cradle Rock
 Rock and Roll Music

On the record label itself for "Face 1", the title of the song School Days is spelled properly, except the subtitle for the English language song is given as "Ring! Ring! Goes the Bell" in the Wikipedia article on the song, but on this product the subtitle is spelled "Ring Goes The Bell".

The reverse face of the product jacket devotes almost half its space to color photographs of the record jackets of ten other Impact Records products, including one called simply Chuck Berry.  Below its photo, that LP is identified in print as "Chuck Berry Vol. 1", but the words Volume 1 did not appear on the product cover, evidenced by the photograph displayed.  Impact's first Chuck Berry anthology LP included the cuts Carol, Sweet Little Sixteen, I Can't Believe, Sweet Rockin', Back to Memphis, Ramblin' Rose, Wee Baby Blues, Louis to Frisco, Bring Another Drink and Sweet Little Rock and Roller (misspelled on the cover), plus promised others.

Impact's first anthology of Chuck Berry's work was number 6886 403.

References 

Chuck Berry compilation albums
1995 compilation albums